The Quanrong or Dog Rong were an ethnic group, classified by the ancient Chinese as "Qiang", active in the northwestern part of China during and after the Zhou dynasty (1046–221 BCE). Their language or languages are considered to have been members of the Tibeto-Burman branch of the Sino-Tibetan languages.

Etymology
Scholars believe Quanrong was a later name for the Xianyun 猃狁 (written with xian, defined as a kind of dog with a long snout [Erya] or a black dog with a yellow face [Shuowen Jiezi]). According to sinologist Li Feng, "It is very probable that when the term Xianyun came to be written with the two characters 獫狁, the notion of 'dog' associated with the character xian thus gave rise to the term Quanrong 犬戎, or the 'Dog Barbarians'."

Claiming ancestry from two white dogs, the Quanrong tribe worshipped a totem in the form of a white dog. They are classified as a nomadic tribe of the Qiang and were the sworn enemies of the Yanhuang tribe.

History 
According to the Book of the Later Han:

The Discourses of Zhou in the Guoyu records that at the time of King Mu of Zhou the power of the Quanrong gradually increased. Conflicts during the king's reign made him consider a punitive expedition to the west against them.  Duke of Zhai was against his father's plan: "this is not advisable. The illustrious former Emperors did not advocate the use of force." King Mu did not listen but won an unexpected victory in the subsequent clash, capturing the five kings of the Quanrong along with five white wolves and five white deer.

In 771 BCE, the Marquess of Shen invited the Quanrong to join him in an attack on King You of Zhou. The joint force subsequently occupied the Zhōu capital Haojing, killing King You and capturing his concubine Bao Si.  In the end, the invaders left after taking a tribute from the Zhou and stealing the Nine Tripod Cauldrons.  Duke Xiang of Qin sent an army to assist the Zhou as well as troops to escort King You's son King Ping of Zhou to the eastern capital of Chengzhou, effectively ending the Western Zhou and ushering in the beginning of the Eastern Zhou dynasty and the Spring and Autumn period.

At the time of Emperor Ming of Han (reigned 58–75 CE) it was said:

During the reign of Emperor Taizong of Tang (reigned 626–649 CE), Court Academician Liǔ Kàng petitioned:

The traditional base of the Quanrong is modern Wēiróng Town in Jingning County, Gansu.

See also 
 Xirong (people)
 Shan Rong
 Murong
 Gyalrong people 
 Qiang people 
 Khitan people
 Jurchen people
 Chunwei
 Guifang
 Xianyun

Notes

References 

 Lectures on Wolf Totem (in Chinese) (Retrieved February 2010)
 

Ancient peoples of China
Zhou dynasty

ja:犬戎